Mohammad A. Arafat is a Bangladeshi academic and a political intellectual of the Awami League. He is a Professor of Strategic Management and Policy at the Canadian University of Bangladesh and Chairman of Suchinta Foundation. He has written many articles in national and international media on various topics such as Bangladesh’s economic developments and challenges, transit and connectivity, appropriate policies for power sector, war crime trial, political development and democracy in Bangladesh etc. He is also a member of the central executive committee of the oldest and largest political party of Bangladesh, Bangladesh Awami League.

Early life 
Arafat was born in Rajshahi.

Career 
Arafat is a syndicate member of the Canadian University of Bangladesh. He is the Chief Advisor to the board of trustees of the Canadian University of Bangladesh. He is the founder of Suchinta Foundation. Arafat gave a speech at the Joy Bangla youth conference in 2015 organized by Centre for Research and Information, the political think tank of the Awami League. He endorsed Annisul Huq for the North Dhaka Mayor election.

On 28 December 2019, Arafat addressed a youth conference, Bangabandhu’s Leadership: Lessons for Today’s Youth, organized by the Centre for Research and Information at the Bangladesh Youth Leadership Center and included Tarana Halim as a speaker. Arafat has called for stronger ties with India and allowing transshipment of goods. He wrote positively about Harsh Vardhan Shringla visit to Bangladesh and described it as "promising".

Arafat called Reza Kibria, son of former Finance Minister Shah AMS Kibria, a traitor for complaining about the human rights situation in Bangladesh to the United States. He criticized the United States for placing sanctions on Rapid Action Battalion and described Gano Adhikar Parishad as a none threat to the Awami League government. The United States sanction Rapid Action Battalion under the Magnitsky Act for extrajudicial killing with specific reference to the Killing of Ekramul Haque.

In September 2022, the Government of Bangladesh dismantled the existing trustee board alleging it had links with Islamist militants and Bangladesh Jamaat-e-Islami. Mayor of North Dhaka and Awami League politician, Atiqul Islam, was appointed chairman and Arafat was appointed a member of the newly created Trustee board.

Arafat was made a member of the Central Working Committee of the Awami League in December 2022.

Personal life 
Arafat married Shomi Kaiser, actress and daughter of Shahidullah Kaiser and Panna Kaiser, on 24 July 2008 which ended in divorce in 2015.

References 

Living people
Bangladeshi academics
People from Rajshahi District
Awami League politicians
Year of birth missing (living people)